The B'nai Abraham congregation in Brenham, Texas, was organized in 1885.

History
Early Jewish settlers in the Washington County, Texas, arrived during the 1860s. B. Levinson, an original founder, arrived in 1861. Alex Simon arrived in 1866. These individuals became active in the business community of Brenham, and as other Jewish settlers arrived, the need for a synagogue grew. The present building was constructed in 1893, after the first caught fire in 1892. L. Fink served as first president, F. Susnitsky as vice president, L. Z. Harrison as treasurer, and J. Lewis and Abe Fink as secretaries. The twenty charter members were led by Rabbi Israel. In the 1990s the synagogue was believed to be the oldest Orthodox Jewish synagogue to have been in continuous use in Texas. Leon Toubin, a Jewish Texan community and business leader, is the caretaker of this place of worship.

Relocation
In early 2015, the building was cut into three sections and moved 90 miles west to the Dell Jewish Community Center in the Northwest Hills neighborhood of Austin, Texas. The building was pieced back together and upgraded with new insulation, restrooms, air-conditioning and electrical wiring. The synagogue became the home of the Congregation Tiferet Israel. The move will cause the loss of historic status for the structure.

Architecture

The structure, located on 302 North Park Street, remains an Orthodox Shul. The projecting structure on the near side is the Mikveh. The white clapboard structure with its pointed arched windows closely resembles the small country churches in the region. Inside the building the Aron Kodesh can be seen on the eastern wall and in the center the Bimah where the Sefer Torah was read.

See also

National Register of Historic Places listings in Washington County, Texas
Recorded Texas Historic Landmarks in Washington County
History of the Jews in Brenham, Texas
Texas Jewish Historical Society
Oldest synagogues in the United States

References

External links

Jews and Judaism in Brenham, Texas
Religious organizations established in 1885
Orthodox synagogues in Texas
Synagogues on the National Register of Historic Places in Texas
National Register of Historic Places in Washington County, Texas
Synagogues completed in 1893
Buildings and structures in Brenham, Texas
1885 establishments in Texas
Relocated buildings and structures in Texas
Recorded Texas Historic Landmarks